The Selex RAT-31DL is a long-range air surveillance radar manufactured by Leonardo (previously Selex ES, SELEX Sistemi Integrati and later Finmeccanica). The acronym RAT stands for Radar Avvistamento Terrestre, an Italian term for such "ground-based reconnaissance radar".

The RAT-31DL is an L-band solid-state active phased array 3D radar with an effective range of over 500 km. It is derivative of widely used RAT-31 SL.

The RAT 31DL is a solid-state active phased array radar with monopulse antenna with 42 rows of 42 Tx/Rx modules of which 24 boosted, each with 2 kW output power. The 360 ° search is performed with four independent beams in the L band at 6 rpm, the vertical pivoting of the beams is done by means of electronic phase shift of the  42 rows feeding the antenna.

RAT-31DL/M

The mobile RAT 31 DL / M radar variant is derived from the stationary FADR version. The RAT 31 DL / M consists of a fold-able antenna and an equipment shelter, which are housed in air transportable 20-foot ISO containers. This configuration allows rapid deployment with high mobility and allows deployment in an unprepared position.

See also
Selex RAN-40L Naval Long Range Surveillance radar.

Operators

Bangladesh Air Force

 Italian Air Force

 German Air Force

 Royal Malaysian Air Force

 Polish Air Force

 Royal Danish Air Force

 Czech Air Force

 Hellenic Air Force

 Hungarian Air Force

 Spanish Air and Space Force

 Royal Thai Air Force

 Egypt Air Force 

 Turkish Air Force

 Royal Air Force

 Indonesian Air Force

References

Military radars of Italy
Ground radars
Military radars of Poland
Military radars of the United Kingdom